Taipingqiao station may refer to:

 Taipingqiao station (Beijing Subway), a station on Line 19 of the Beijing Subway
 Taipingqiao station (Harbin Metro), a station on Line 1 and Line 3 of Harbin Metro